Helsey is a hamlet in the civil parish of Mumby, and the East Lindsey district of Lincolnshire, England.

In 1885 Kelly's noted that Helsey was in the parish of Hogsthorpe, an agricultural area of  supporting the production of wheat, beans and oats, and an 1881 population of 719.

References

External links
"Mumby", Genuki. Retrieved 24 October 2011

Hamlets in Lincolnshire
East Lindsey District